Black tea (also literally translated as red tea from various East Asian languages), is a type of tea that is more oxidized than oolong, yellow, white and green teas. Black tea is generally stronger in flavour than other teas. All five types are made from leaves of the shrub (or small tree) Camellia sinensis, though Camellia taliensis is also used rarely.

Two principal varieties of the species are used – the small-leaved Chinese variety plant (C. sinensis var. sinensis), used for most other types of teas, and the large-leaved Assamese plant (C. sinensis var. assamica), which was traditionally mainly used for black tea, although in recent years some green and white teas have been produced. 

First originating in China, the beverage's name there is hong cha ("red tea") due to the color of the oxidized leaves when processed appropriately. Today, the drink is widespread throughout East and Southeast Asia, both in consumption and harvesting, including in China, Japan, Korea and Singapore. Similar variants are also available in South Asian countries.

While green tea usually loses its flavour within a year, black tea retains its flavour for several years. For this reason, it has long been an article of trade, and compressed bricks of black tea even served as a form of de facto currency in Mongolia, Tibet and Siberia well into the 19th century.

Varieties and names
Generally, unblended black teas are named after the region in which they are produced. Often, different regions are known for producing teas with characteristic flavours.

Blends

Many finished black teas consist of blends of various varieties of black tea. In addition, black tea is often blended with various other plants or flavourings in order to obtain a beverage.

Manufacture

 After the harvest, the leaves are first withered by blowing air on them.
 Then black teas are processed in either of two ways, CTC (crush, tear, curl) or orthodox. The CTC method produces leaves of fannings or dust grades that are commonly used in tea bags but also produces higher (broken leaf) grades such as BOP CTC and GFBOP CTC (see gradings below for more details). This method is efficient and effective for producing a better quality product from medium and lower quality leaves of consistently dark color. Orthodox processing is done either by machines or by hand. Hand processing is used for high quality teas. While the methods employed in orthodox processing differ by tea type, this style of processing results in the high quality loose tea sought by many connoisseurs. The tea leaves are allowed to completely oxidize.
 Orthodox The withered tea leaves are heavily rolled either by hand or mechanically through the use of a cylindrical rolling table or a rotovane. The rolling table consists of a ridged table-top moving in an eccentric manner to a large hopper of tea leaves, in which the leaves are pressed down onto the table-top. The process produces a mixture of whole and broken leaves and particles which are then sorted, oxidized and dried. The rotorvane (rotovane), created by Ian McTear in 1957 can be used to replicate the orthodox process. The rotovane consisted of an auger pushing withered tea leaves through a vane cylinder which crushes and evenly cuts the leaves, however the process is more recently superseded by the boruah continuous roller, which consists of an oscillating conical roller around the inside of a ridged cylinder. The rotorvane can consistently duplicate broken orthodox processed black tea of even sized broken leaves, however it cannot produce whole leaf black tea. The broken leaves and particles from the orthodox method can feed into the CTC method for further processing into fanning or dust grade teas.
 "Cut (or crush), tear, curl" (CTC) A production method developed by William McKercher in 1930. It is considered by some as a significantly improved method of producing black tea through the mincing of withered tea leaves. The use of a rotovane to precut the withered tea is a common preprocessing method prior to feeding into the CTC. CTC machines then further shred the leaves from the rotovane by passing them through several stages of contra-rotating rotors with surface patterns that cut and tear the leaves to very fine particles.
 Next, the leaves are oxidized under controlled temperature and humidity. (This process is also called "fermentation", which is a misnomer since no actual fermentation takes place. Polyphenol oxidase is the enzyme active in the process.) The level of oxidation determines the type (or "color") of the tea; with fully oxidised becoming black tea, low oxidised becoming green tea, and partially oxidised making up the various levels of oolong tea. This can be done on the floor in batches or on a conveyor bed with air flow for proper oxidation and temperature control. Since oxidation begins at the rolling stage itself, the time between these stages is also a crucial factor in the quality of the tea; however, fast processing of the tea leaves through continuous methods can effectively make this a separate step. The oxidation has an important effect on the taste of the end product, but the amount of oxidation is not an indication of quality. Tea producers match oxidation levels to the teas they produce to give the desired end characteristics.
 Then the leaves are dried to arrest the oxidation process.
 Finally, the leaves are sorted into grades according to their sizes (whole leaf, brokens, fannings and dust), usually with the use of sieves. The tea could be further sub-graded according to other criteria.

The tea is then ready for packaging.

Tea grading

Black tea is usually graded on one of four scales of quality. Whole-leaf teas are the highest quality, with the best whole-leaf teas graded as "orange pekoe". After the whole-leaf teas, the scale degrades to broken leaves, fannings, then dusts. Whole-leaf teas are produced with little or no alteration to the tea leaf. This results in a finished product with a coarser texture than that of bagged teas. Whole-leaf teas are widely considered the most valuable, especially if they contain leaf tips. Broken leaves are commonly sold as medium-grade loose teas.

Smaller broken varieties may be included in tea bags. Fannings are usually small particles of tea left over from the production of larger tea varieties, but are occasionally manufactured specifically for use in bagged teas. Dusts are the finest particles of tea left over from production of the above varieties, and are often used for tea bags with very fast and harsh brews. Fannings and dusts are useful in bagged teas because the greater surface area of the many particles allows for a fast, complete diffusion of the tea into the water. Fannings and dusts usually have a darker colour, lack of sweetness, and stronger flavour when brewed.

Brewing
Generally, one uses .08 ounces (2.26 g) of tea per  of water. However, this can vary widely by custom or taste as in another "generic" version of the same can be the same amount of tea per  or 50% more dilute.

Whole-leaf black teas, and black teas to be served with milk or lemon, should be steeped four to five minutes. The more delicate black teas, such as Darjeeling, should be steeped for three to four minutes. The same holds for broken leaf teas, which have more surface area and need less brewing time than whole leaves. Longer steeping times makes the tea bitter (at this point, it is referred to as being "stewed" in the UK). When the tea has brewed long enough to suit the drinker's taste, it should be strained before it is served.

A cold vessel lowers the steep temperature; to avoid this, always rinse the vessel with ≥90 °C (≥194 °F) water before brewing.

Alternatively, the first brew should be 60sec., the second brew 40sec., and the third brew 60sec. If the tea is of high quality, it may be brewed several times by progressively adding 10sec. to the brew time following the third infusion (note: when using a larger tea pot the ratio of tea to water will need to be adjusted to achieve similar results).

The ISO Standard 3103 defines how to brew tea for tasting.  "This standard is not meant to define the proper method for brewing tea intended for general consumption, but rather to document a tea brewing procedure where meaningful sensory comparisons can be made." This mix is thus more than twice as concentrated for normal consumption.

 ISO 3103 black tea brewing
 Brew temperature 90–95 °C
 100ml water
 2g of tea
 Brewing time is 6min

Research

Plain black tea without sweeteners or additives contains caffeine, but negligible quantities of calories or nutrients. Black teas from Camellia sinensis contain polyphenols, such as flavonoids, which are under preliminary research for their potential to affect blood pressure and blood lipids as risk factors for cardiovascular disease, but overall this research remains inconclusive.

Long-term consumption of black tea only slightly lowered systolic and diastolic blood pressures (about 1–2mmHg). Black tea consumption may be associated with a reduced risk of stroke, but there is only limited research to evaluate this possibility.

Meta-analyses of observational studies concluded that black tea consumption does not affect the development of oral cancers in Asian or Caucasian populations, esophageal cancer or prostate cancer in Asian populations, or lung cancer.

The visible film often formed on black tea consists of oxidized polyphenols and calcium carbonate, and is therefore more pronounced for tea brewed with hard water.

See also

 Assam tea
 Gunfire (drink)
 Nepal tea
 Rize Tea
 Thai tea
 Vietnamese tea
 Yellow tea
 English breakfast tea
 Irish breakfast tea

References

Asian drinks